The Tun Abdul Ghafar Baba Memorial is a museum in Peringgit, Melaka, Malaysia. The museum commemorates the life of former Deputy Prime Minister of Malaysia, Tun Ghafar Baba.

History
The building was constructed in 1956. The building used to be Ghafar Baba's residence when he was the Chief Minister of Malacca in 1959–1967. In 2006, the building was converted into a museum and was opened to the public.

Exhibitions
The memorial is divided into two exhibition halls. The lower hall displays most of his personal belongings during his reign as Chief Minister of Malacca, Minister and Deputy Prime Minister. The upper hall displays his various souvenirs, photos, books, television set, furniture and fittings that were used by him and his family.

See also
 List of tourist attractions in Malacca
 List of museums in Malaysia

References

2006 establishments in Malaysia
Museums in Malacca
Biographical museums in Asia